Espian or Ispain may refer to:
Esfidan, Maneh and Samalqan
Nowabad-e Espian